"The Red Dot" is the 29th episode of the sitcom Seinfeld. It is the twelfth episode of the show's third season. It first aired on December 11, 1991.

Plot
Elaine gets George a job at Pendant Publishing. To repay her, he buys her a cashmere sweater that has a minor flaw, for which it was marked down considerably. Kramer spots it and points it out to Elaine. She becomes furious at George and returns the sweater to him. Jerry inadvertently reintroduces Elaine's boyfriend Dick, a recovering alcoholic, to liquor. This causes Dick to "fall off the wagon," thus losing his job at the same publishing company where George and Elaine work. Later, a drunk Dick heckles Jerry during one of his stand up comedy acts.

While George is working at his new job, he becomes attracted to a cleaning lady named Evie and has sex with her after they both drink Hennigan's Scotch. The next day, Evie gets upset over what happened the previous night and threatens to report it to the boss of the company. George tries to compensate with her by offering the flawed cashmere sweater. Evie is overjoyed with the gift, launching into an emotional story about her first cashmere experience. She then notices the red dot, and consequently gets him fired.

Elaine and Jerry arrive at the office just as George is beginning to pack his things. After getting into an argument they hear a drunken Dick rampaging through the hallway, coming to get his revenge on Jerry for losing his job. The three hide under George's desk as Dick approaches. George offers the cashmere sweater to Dick; this calms his rage until he sees the dot. Jerry recounts the incident during his stand up comedy act. Dick is among the audience, smiling with a non-alcoholic drink in his hand.

References

External links 
 

Seinfeld (season 3) episodes
1991 American television episodes
Television episodes written by Larry David